Written in the late 1950s and early 1960s, the Brains Benton Mysteries chronicle the adventures of young teenagers Barclay "Brains" Benton (X) and his friend James "Jimmy" Carson (Operative Three); they together form the "Benton and Carson International Detective Agency." The Brains Benton books are similar in tone to The Mad Scientists' Club books.

The series was originally published by the Golden Press, with reprints being done in the same format by Whitman Books, both imprints of Western Publishing.  All six titles appeared in hardback with only two volumes being reprinted in paperback.

Titles
 The Case of the Missing Message (1959).  When Jimmy braves the spooky old Madden place, he spots a boy in hiding.  Thinking he's kidnapped, he and Brains sneak in and foil a real kidnapper, while rescue arrives atop a stampeding elephant! 
 The Case of the Counterfeit Coin (1960).  When Jimmy receives an "ancient" Greek coin on his paper route, he and Brains are stalked by mysterious strangers out to steal it back and a feisty girl with a mean right hook!
 The Case of the Stolen Dummy (1961).  When the boys venture to creepy Boiling Lake, they spot a submerged car - with a body inside - and end up chasing crooks on a wild midnight ride in a hot rod!
 The Case of the Roving Rolls (1961).  When the boys meet a Rolls-Royce on the run and a real prince with a problem, they finally use the "international" in "Benton and Carson International Detective Agency"!
 The Case of the Waltzing Mouse (1961).  When the boys help an old man with a traveling animal act, they end up scuba diving for "treasure" and barely survive a boat chase in the "Battle of Lake Carmine"!
 The Case of the Painted Dragon (1961).  When the boys meet a new classmate, an orphaned Japanese boy with a Sumo bodyguard, they're pitched into a search for missing pearls and a conspiracy of dangerous thugs.

The books were written by Charles Spain Verral.  However, after book #1, all of the remaining books had the pen name of George Wyatt as author. Verral had turned over the writing to another author but was not pleased with the results; he then took the outlines of each book and rewrote them.

Later volumes by other authors

Charles Spain Verral's characters have inspired a generation of twenty-first century authors who endeavor to continue the Brains Benton series.

By Charles E. Morgan III:

 The Case of the Carrier Pigeon (2006)
 The Case of the Lost Loot (2004)
 The Case of the Stolen Jewelry (2009)
 The Case of The Final Message (2011)
 The Case of the Disappearing Magician (2014)
 The Case of the Crossed Wire (2016)
 The Case of the Aviator's Plans (2017)
 The Case of the Crooked Deal (2018)
 The Case of the Spy's Revenge (2018)
 The Case of the Ghost Town's Secret (2020)
 The Case of the Templar's Sword (2021)
 The Adventures of Benton and Carson (2016) This is a series of six short stories.  The first one describes the case in which Jimmy first meets Brains on the roof of the school building.  A later story is actually narrated by Brains himself, and includes some surprising comments about his partner.  There are also stories set at Christmas and Veteran's Day.

By Fred Rexroad
 The Case of the Wounded Pigeon (2008)

By Scott Lockwood:

 The Case of the Courier Cat (2010)
 A Scandal at Crestwood College (2010)
 Brains Benton and the Subtraction Mystery (2010)
 Brains Benton and the Case of the Other Missing Message  (2016)
The last two of these are set later in time, when Brains and Jimmy are adults.  Brains has taken a position with SwifTech Labs (headed by non other than Tom Swift Jr.) and has a girlfriend who is an investigative reporter.

By Thomas Hudson:

 The Case of the Insane Woman Down Memory Lane (2015)

By Sean Murphy:

 The Case of the Dancing Walrus (2015). Contains three stories.
 The Case of the Haunted Airplane (2021)

References

External links
 The Brains Benton Anthology Detailed information about Brains Benton
 Brains Benton In Europe Guide to the various European editions of Brain Benton

Book series introduced in 1959
Canadian young adult novels
Young adult novel series
Juvenile series
Benton, Brains
Children's mystery novels